Ijaz Ahmad Azad (born 10 January 2004) is an Afghan cricketer. He made his first-class debut for Kabul Region in the 2019 Ahmad Shah Abdali 4-day Tournament on 4 April 2019. He made his List A debut on 12 October 2020, for Amo Region in the 2020 Ghazi Amanullah Khan Regional One Day Tournament.

References

External links
 

2004 births
Living people
Afghan cricketers
Amo Sharks cricketers
Kabul Eagles cricketers